Fuerza Guerrera Nueva Generación (sometimes "Fuerza Guerrera NG") is a Mexican luchador enmascarado, or masked professional wrestler currently working for the Mexican professional wrestling promotion International Wrestling Revolution Group (IWRG). He worked under the ring name Imposible from his debut in 2008 until late in 2019 when he took the name "Fuerza Guerra Nueva Generación". He is not related to Fuerza Guerrera, but is officially allowed to use the name by his trainer.

His real name is not a matter of public record, as is often the case with masked wrestlers in Mexico where their private lives are kept a secret from the wrestling fans. Imposible was trained for his professional wrestling career by Negro Navarro. He is the current and two time holder of the IWRG Intercontinental Middleweight Championship, previously held the IWRG Intercontinental Lightweight Championship and the IWRG Intercontinental Tag Team Championship with Aramís. For years he was part of Los Mariachis Locos with El Hijo del Diablo and El Diablo Jr., with whom he won the Distrito Federal Trios Championship twice. He won the 2012 version of the El Protector tag team tournament with X-Fly and the 2017 Rey del Ring tournament and championship.

Professional wrestling career
In Lucha Libre there is a long-standing tradition of keeping the personal information of masked wrestlers private from the general public unless they at some point are forced to unmask in the ring. This secrecy extends to wrestling promotions not revealing a wrestler's real name and news outlets not asking for personal details in interviews. Because of this tradition the real name of the wrestler known under the ring names Imposible is not common knowledge.

International Wrestling Revolution Group (2010–present)
The wrestler known as Imposible made his debut under that ring name in 2010 as part of trainee shows for the International Wrestling Revolution Group (IWRG) Training School, but it is possible he made his debut prior to that under an undisclosed ring name. His ring character was that of a masked Jamaican. He appeared on his first major IWRG show on January 13, 2011, IWRG's first annual Torneo Relampago de Proyeccion a Nuevas Promesas de la Lucha Libre (Spanish for "Projecting a new promise lightning tournament"). For the opening match of the show he teamed up with Epidemia to defeat Heros and Mascarita de Oro. The following year the tournament was renamed El Protector, in which Imposible participated. The tournament format was to team up a rookie (Novato) with a veteran wrestler for a tag team tournament. Imposible was teamed up with veteran X-Fly and in the first round they defeated the team of Eterno and Apolo Estrada, Jr., in the second round they defeated Saruman and Veneno and finally they defeated Centvrión and Negro Navarro in the finals to win the 2012 tournament. In early 2013 Imposible changed his ring character to that of a caveman, but kept the name the same. In the summer of 2012 Impossible was one of six wrestlers competing for the vacant IWRG Intercontinental Lightweight Championship, which he ended up winning on July 1 as he eliminated Astro Rey Jr. and Dragon Celestial to become the 12th over all Lightweight Champion. Later in the year he would revert to his original Jamaican ring character with no real explanation for the changes. In 2014 Imposible was involved in a storyline feud with another masked wrestler called "El Hijo de la Bestia" ("The Son of the Beast"), a storyline that led to both wrestlers putting their mask on the line in a Lucha de Apuestas, or "bet match". Imposible won and forced his opponent to unmask as per Lucha Libre rules. In late 2014 Imposible teamed up with Chicano to compete for the vacant IWRG Intercontinental Tag Team Championship, defeating the team of El Hijo del Diablo and Apolo Estrada Jr. in the first round, before losing to the team of Canis Lupus and Eterno in the finals of the tournament. On May 1, 2016 Los Mariachis Locos lost the Distrito Federal Trios Championship to Los Tortuga Ninjas ("The Ninja Turtles"; Leo, Mike and Rafy). In August 2016, Imposible announced that he was giving up the lightweight championship as he felt he needed to move up into the middleweight division and challenge for the IWRG Intercontinental Middleweight Championship. On January 22 Imposible lost the middleweight championship to Relámpago, after which an angry Imposible made a Lucha de Apuestas challenge.

Championships and accomplishments
International Wrestling Revolution Group
Distrito Federal Trios Championship (2 times) – with Hijo del Diablo and, Diablo I Jr.
IWRG Intercontinental Lightweight Championship (1 time)
IWRG Intercontinental Middleweight Championship (2 times, current)
IWRG Intercontinental Tag Team Championship (1 time, current)  with Aramís
IWRG Rey del Ring 2017
IWRG El Protector: 2012 (with X-Fly)
Esto Es Lucha-Pro Wrestling
Copa Tony Sugar – with Carta Brava Jr.

Lucha de Apuesta record

Notes

References

Mexican male professional wrestlers
Living people
Masked wrestlers
Unidentified wrestlers
Professional wrestlers from the State of Mexico
Year of birth missing (living people)